Belews Creek may refer to:

Communities
 Belews Creek, Missouri, an unincorporated community
 Belews Creek Township, Forsyth County, North Carolina
 Belews Creek, North Carolina, an unincorporated community in the above township

Other
 Belews Creek (Missouri), a stream
 Belews Creek Power Station, a generating facility located on Belews Lake in Stokes County, North Carolina